Kharlamov (female Kharlamova (Харламова)) is a Russian surname. Notable people with the surname include:

Alexander Kharlamov, ice hockey player
Garik Kharlamov, Russian actor, resident of Comedy Club Russia
Nikolay Mikhaylovich Kharlamov, military leader
Semyon Kharlamov, a Soviet aircraft pilot and Hero of the Soviet Union
Sergei Kharlamov, a Russian footballer
Valeri Kharlamov, ice hockey player
Vasily Kharlamov, military leader
Viatcheslav M. Kharlamov (born 1950), Russian-French mathematician

Russian-language surnames